Henry Mayo (13 November 1847 – 30 October 1891) was an English cricketer. He played fourteen first-class matches for Surrey between 1868 and 1870.

See also
 List of Surrey County Cricket Club players

References

External links
 

1847 births
1891 deaths
English cricketers
Surrey cricketers
People from Lambeth
Cricketers from Greater London